Registered Cossacks comprised special Cossack units of the Polish–Lithuanian Commonwealth army in the 16th and 17th centuries.

Registered Cossacks became a military formation of the Commonwealth army beginning in 1572 soon after the Union of Lublin (1569), when most of the territory of modern Ukraine passed to the Crown of Poland. Registered Cossack formations were based on the Zaporozhian Cossacks who already lived on the lower reaches of the Dnieper River amidst the Pontic steppes as well as on self-defense formations within settlements in the region of modern Central and Southern Ukraine.

History

Origins 
The first recorded official plan for enlisting Cossack formations as a border service in Poland-Lithuania was brought to the State Council of the Grand Duchy of Lithuania in 1524 by Semen Polozovic and Kristof Kmitic. However, due to a lack of funds, the idea was not realized. The starosta of Cherkasy, Ostap Dashkevych, revived the idea at the 1533 council in Piotrków Trybunalski. Dashkevych tried to show that in order to protect the borders beyond the Dnieper River it would be necessary to maintain an army of 2,000 soldiers and several hundred cavalrymen. He pointed out the importance of establishing forts on the river's islands to keep Tatar  raids in check.

On July 21, 1541 the King of Poland and Grand Duke of Lithuania, Sigismund I the Old, issued an edict to the starosta of Cherkasy, Andrei Glebovich Pronsky (?-1557, a descendant of the  Pronsk princes), in which he strictly warned Pronsky to control the Cossack raids against Tatar uluses. With the start of the Livonian War of 1558–1583, the voivode of Kiev, Konstanty Wasyl Ostrogski, and the starosta of Cherkasy, Alexander Wiśniowecki, recruited Cossacks into their armies, while in 1568 King and Grand Duke Sigismund II Augustus sent a proposition to the Zaporizhian Sich to join his foreign campaign and to sign up for royal service.

Sigismund II Augustus decreed the formation of registered Cossacks on June 5, 1572 when the King confirmed the orders of Great Crown Hetman Jerzy Jazłowiecki, the voivode of Podole and Ruthenia, for state service. The registered Cossacks were the only military Cossack formation recognized by the Polish–Lithuanian Commonwealth.

Batory and Wars in Livonia, Moldavia and Muscovy 

The most well-known of the first recorded Cossack reforms came from King of Poland and Grand Duke of Lithuania Stefan Batory. At first Batory tried to control Cossack forces that were waging wars in Moldavia and Wallachia as well as other parts of the Ottoman Empire. On 4 April 1578 he issued four universals to all local government officials. He asked them to support Jan Tarlo in an investigation of the coup-d'etat by Zaporozhian leader Ivan Pidkova. The coup overthrew the Ottoman-installed Hospodar of Moldavia, Peter the Lame, in 1577 under the pretense that Ivan was the brother of the previous voivode of Moldavia, John III the Terrible. Batory also ordered the voivode of Kiev, Konstanty Wasyl Ostrogski, to send a punitive expedition against Pidkova and asked the mayors of Khmilnyk, Bar, Bratslav, Vinnytsia, Bila Tserkva and others to support him. At the same time Batory sent his ambassador Marcin Broniowski to the Khan of Crimea proposing cooperative actions against the Zaporizhian Sich.

On July 27, 1578 Batory sent ambassador Jancsi Bereg to the Zaporozhian host proposing the Cossacks redirect their raids from Moldavia to Muscovy. To further discuss the proposition, a delegation headed by Andriy Lykhansky arrived in Lviv on September 15, 1578. The next day it was agreed that 500 Cossacks would be enlisted for fifteen florins each per year. The Starosta of Cherkasy and Kaniv, Prince Michał Wiśniowiecki, was appointed hetman; Jan Oryszowski served as his deputy. The Cossacks' headquarters was established at Trakhtemyriv (today a village in Cherkasy Raion) with its monastery, which was used as the Cossacks' hospital. The Cossacks were given a banner that denoted their relationship to the state army and Bereg promised to pay them in Cherkasky on Saint Nicolas Day. The Cossacks evidently were paid only after the Siege of Pskov in 1581. Even though the official register consisted of only 500 names, in reality the contingent of registered Cossacks numbered around 4,000.

Batory's military reform, however, proved ineffective. The Polish government promised to pay the Cossacks' salary, but often did not do so. The Cossacks frequently and proudly pledged their allegiance to serve the King of Poland and hoped for at least the same financial compensation as the regular army. Due to the hold-ups in pay some Cossacks returned to raiding the Tatars and Moldavians.

In 1590 the Sejm issued a new declaration re-creating the Cossack units. A royal edict  issued on July 25, 1590, envisaged registering 1,000 Cossacks for policing duty in order to prevent unauthorized raids into neighboring countries. The registered Cossacks were paid from 5 to 12  zlotys each quarter, and the Zaporizhian Sich was selected as their headquarters. As the Polish interests aimed in securing the Swedish crown, however, the Cossack movement was allowed to grow out of control, leading to a series of local rebellions by polkovnyk Krzysztof Kosiński and Severyn Nalyvaiko, with assistance from kosh otaman of the Zaporozhian Cossacks Hryhoriy Loboda.

Organization 

Registered Cossacks formed an elite among the Cossacks, serving in the military under officers (starshyna), colonels (polkovnyk) and generals (hetman), under the Grand Crown Hetman (the highest Commonwealth military commander). A substantial minority of Cossacks formed skilled light cavalry units (choragiew), excellent skirmishers trained in mounted archery (and later using firearms), making lightning raids, harassing heavier, slower formations and disengaging. Those units were often used as support for heavy elite Commonwealth cavalry, the husaria, and were much cheaper to form than a hussar unit. The main Cossack units were the infantry, known for their tabor formation.

Registered Cossacks had many privileges, including personal freedom, exemption from many taxes and duties, and the right to receive wages, although the Commonwealth military's fiscal problems, led to delayed payments, often via items like clothing or weapons instead of coin.

Many Cossacks were skilled warriors and their major income source came from raids on the southern neighbors of the Commonwealth: the (Ottoman Empire and its vassals). However, only a small number were actually 'registered Cossacks'; the exact number was from few hundred to few thousand and varied over time, usually increasing during wartime. This led to many social and political tensions, especially as szlachta (Polish and Ukrainian gentry) continually attempted to force the Cossacks into submission as peasants, while the Cossacks demanded significant expansions of the Cossack register. Furthermore, the Cossack-szlachta conflict was aggravated as Cossacks often supported Commonwealth monarchs like Wladyslaw IV Waza who were at odds with Polish szlachta who wished to further limit the monarch's powers. The tensions between the Cossacks and szlachta grew from the late 16th century and resulted in several uprisings with the registered Cossacks often forced to choose sides between supporting their own people or the szlachta-backed Commonwealth forces.

Eventually the king's refusal to expand the registry led to the Khmelnytsky uprising of 1648. A Russian-Polish alliance was formed against Bohdan Khmelnitsky, with his Cossacks being declared rebels against all order. Don Cossack raids on Crimea left Khmelnitsky without the aid of his usual Tatar allies. The rebellion ended with the 1654 Treaty of Pereyaslav in which Khmelnitsky's Cossacks, so as to destroy the Russian-Polish alliance against them, pledged their loyalty to the Russian Tsar, who guaranteed their protection, the recognition of their starshyna (officer-nobility) and their property and autonomy under his rule, freeing the Cossacks from the Polish sphere of influence in favor of Russian hegemony. Despite this, the Registered Cossacks remained an official unit of the Polish–Lithuanian Commonwealth army until 1699, with individual Cossacks travelling to the Commonwealth to enroll in its ranks.

Cossack Hetmanate
According to the Treaty of Zboriv, signed on August 17, 1649, the number of Registered Cossacks increased up to forty thousand.

{| class="wikitable" style="text-align:center;margin-left:1em;width:21%;"
|+The Regiments of Registered Cossacks in 1649.
|-
! # !!Headquarters !! Number of Registered Cossacks
|-
| 1 || Bila Tserkva || 2990 
|-
| 2 || Bratslav || 2662
|-
| 3 || Cherkasy || 2990
|-
| 4 || Chernihiv || 998
|-
| 5 || Chyhyryn || 3220
|-
| 6 || Kalnyk || 2050
|-
| 7 || Kaniv || 3167
|-
| 8 || Kiev || 2002
|-
| 9 || Korsun || 3470
|-
| 10 || Kropyvna || 1993
|-
| 11 || Myrhorod || 3009
|-
| 12 || Nizhyn || 991
|-
| 13 || Pereyaslav || 2986
|-
| 14 || Poltava || 2970
|-
| 15 || Pryluky || 1996
|-
| 16 || Uman || 2977
|}

References

Bibliography

External links
 Registered Cossacks at Encyclopedia of Ukraine.

Cossacks
Zaporozhian Host
Military history of the Polish–Lithuanian Commonwealth
Military units and formations established in 1572
Military history of Ukraine
1572 establishments in the Polish–Lithuanian Commonwealth
Military units and formations of Ukraine